Charles Montgomery may refer to:
Charles Montgomery (writer) (born 1968), Canadian writer and photojournalist
Buddy Montgomery (Charles Montgomery, 1930–2009), American musician
Sir Charles Montgomery (Royal Navy officer) (born 1955), British admiral
Charles C. Montgomery (1818–1880), New York politician
Charlie Montgomery (1924–1999), Australian rugby player
Chuck Biscuits (Charles Montgomery, born 1965), Canadian drummer
Chuck Montgomery (editor), see American Cinema Editors Awards 2008
Hubert Montgomery (Sir Charles Hubert Montgomery, 1876–1942), British civil servant and diplomat
Charles Montgomery Burns, or Mr Burns, a character in The Simpsons
Charles Montgomery (American Horror Story), a fictional character
Charles F. Montgomery (1910–1978), American art connoisseur, teacher, and scholar

See also